Cuadernos de Historia is a peer-reviewed academic journal specialising in the history, archaeology and anthropology. It was established in 1980 by Osvaldo Silva among others. Apart from original articles the journal accepts unpublished documents and book reviews.

External links

References

Archaeology journals
Anthropology journals
History of the Americas journals
Biannual journals
Publications established in 1980
University of Chile academic journals
Spanish-language journals
1980 establishments in Chile